Broadland is a local government district in Norfolk, England, named after the Norfolk Broads. The population of the local authority district taken at the 2011 Census was 124,646. Its council is based in Thorpe St Andrew.

In 2013, Broadland was announced as the most peaceful locality within the United Kingdom, having the lowest level of violent crime in the country.

History
The district was formed on 1 April 1974 by the merger of St Faith's and Aylsham Rural District and part of Blofield and Flegg Rural District.

Politics

The council is currently under Conservative control, as it has been for the majority of its existence, with the exception of two periods of no overall control. The council consists of 47 councillors, elected from 27 wards.  After the most recent full council elections held on 2 May 2019, the composition of the council is as follows:

UK Youth Parliament

Although the UK Youth Parliament is an apolitical organisation, the elections are run in a way similar to that of the Local Elections. The votes come from 11 to 18-year olds and are combined to make the decision of the next, 2-year Member of Youth Parliament. The elections are run at different times across the country with Broadland's typically being in early Spring and bi-annually.

Due to the large scale nature of Broadland's and its bordering with all other districts, the district is represented by all four MYPs for Norfolk for ease and true representation.

Composition
The district is entirely parished, and is made up of 65 civil parishes.

The district contains the following civil parishes:

Acle, Alderford, Attlebridge, Aylsham
Beeston St. Andrew, Beighton, Belaugh, Blickling, Blofield, Booton, Brampton, Brandiston, Brundall, Burgh and Tuttington, Buxton Lammas, Buxton
Cantley, Cawston, Coltishall, Crostwick
Drayton
Felthorpe, Foulsham, Freethorpe, Frettenham
Great Plumstead, Great Witchingham, Guestwick
Hainford, Halvergate, Haveringland, Hellesdon, Hemblington, Hevingham, Heydon, Honingham, Horsford, Horsham St Faith, Horsham St Faith and Newton St Faith, Horstead with Stanninghall
Lingwood and Burlingham, Little Plumstead, Little Witchingham
Marsham, Morton on the Hill
Old Catton, Oulton
Postwick with Witton
Rackheath, Reedham, Reepham, Ringland
Salhouse, Salle, South Walsham, Spixworth, Sprowston, Stratton Strawless, Strumpshaw, Swannington
Taverham, Themelthorpe, Thorpe St. Andrew
Upton with Fishley
Weston Longville, Woodbastwick, Wood Dalling, Wroxham

Climate
Climate in this area has mild differences between highs and lows, and there is adequate rainfall year-round.  The Köppen Climate Classification subtype for this climate is "Cfb". (Marine West Coast Climate/Oceanic climate).

Controversies 
A total of £357,000 was paid to two managers leaving Broadland council as a result of the merger of two management teams at Broadland and South Norfolk councils, reported Private Eye in October 2020.  (A further £594,000 in termination payments was to be shared between three managers leaving South Norfolk council due to the merger.) The councils reportedly claimed these so-called "golden goodbyes" would actually save money, as they would have fewer highly paid senior officials after they departed.

Arms

References

 
Non-metropolitan districts of Norfolk